The legislative branch of Portland, Maine, is a city council. It is a nine seat council, composed of representatives from the city's five districts, three councilors elected citywide and the full-time elected Mayor of Portland. The eight councilors are elected for three-year terms, while the Mayor is elected for a four-year term. 

The Council is officially non-partisan, though councilors are often known for their political party affiliation.

In 1923, the city transitioned from a Mayor–council government to a Council–manager government. This was in alignment with national trends in metropolitan governments, and also partially motivated by the influence of the Maine Ku Klux Klan, which resented what was perceived as the growing power of ethnic and religious minorities. In 2011 the city charter was changed to allow an election for mayor again in 2011. Subsequent elections were held in 2015 and 2019.

In 2020, voters approved a proposal to switch elections for City Council and school board to ranked-choice elections. 

In 2022, voters approved a proposal to switch elections for City Council to Proportional Rank Choice Voting.

The Portland City Council meets at Portland City Hall, an historic 1909 building on Congress Street.

Current Councilors
 Mayor: Kate Snyder, Democrat, elected in the 2019 election (since 2019)
 District 1: Belinda Ray, Democrat (since 2015)
 District 2: Spencer Thibodeau, Democrat (since 2015)
 District 3: Tae Chong, Democrat (since 2019)
 District 4: Andrew Zarro, Democrat (since 2020)
 District 5: Mark Dion, Democrat (since 2020)
 At-Large: Pious Ali, Democrat (since 2016)
 At-Large: April Fournier, Democrat (since 2020)
 At-Large: Nicholas Mavodones, Democrat (since 1997)

Mayor (at-large): Kate Snyder
 
Kate Snyder is a non-profit executive who beat incumbent mayor Ethan Strimling as well as city councilor Spencer Thibodeau in the 2019 Portland, Maine mayoral election. Days after the election Snyder told the press “We know the issues and we’ll continue to work on them".

District 1: Belinda Ray
Belinda Ray was elected in 2015 to represent District 1 following the retirement of Kevin Donoghue. Ray is a resident of Portland's East Bayside neighborhood, having lived there since 2004. She helped found the East Bayside Neighborhood Organization (EBNO), and served sequentially as Vice President, President, and Community Organizer of EBNO. Ray was elected to succeed Donoghue as the District 1 councilor in a five-way race in which she garnered 39% of the vote.

District 2: Spencer Thibodeau
Spencer Thibodeau (born March 18, 1988) is a real estate attorney and native of Cincinnati, Ohio, who was elected in 2015 to represent District 2 following the retirement of David Marshall.

District 3: Tae Chong
Tae Chong Is a business counselor and former liaison for the Portland Police Department. He was elected to represent District 3 in 2019 beating four others including former councilor Edward Suslovic.

District 4: Andrew Zarro

District 5: Mark Dion

At-Large: Pious Ali
Elected to the council in 2016 after serving one term (3 years) on the City's Board of Public Education 2013-2016. He won his race by 62% in a three-way race to replace the incumbent Jon Hinck. Ali works at the University of Southern Maine’s Muskie School of Public Service He is an alumnus of the Institute for Civic Leadership (now known as Lift360), and in 2015, was named Lift360’s Most Distinguished Alumnus. A native of Ghana, Ali immigrated to the United States in 2000. and has lived in Portland since 2008.

At-Large: April Fournier

At-Large: Nick Mavodones

See also
 List of mayors of Portland, Maine

References

External links
 Portland City Council

Government of Portland, Maine
City councils in the United States